Poore is a surname, and may refer to:

People
 Benjamin Perley Poore (1820–1870), American journalist
 Dennis Poore (1916–1987), British businessman 
 Henry Rankin Poore (1859–1940), American artist and author
 Herbert Poore (died 1217), English cleric
 Kimberly Poore Moser (born 1962), American politician
 Matt Poore (born 1930), cricketer 
 Nina Douglas-Hamilton, Duchess of Hamilton (1878–1948), born Nina Mary Benita Poore
 Richard Poore (died 1237), English cleric at Salisbury 
 Robert Poore (1866–1938), English cricketer

See also 
 
 Poore Baronets
 Poor (disambiguation)
 Pore (disambiguation)

English-language surnames
Surnames of English origin
Surnames of British Isles origin